José Francisco Nava (born 19 January 1983) is a Chilean former track and field athlete who competed in the pole vault. He also competed, less frequently, in the long jump, triple jump and decathlon.

His first major senior medal was a bronze at the 2002 Ibero-American Championships in Athletics – an honour he repeated in 2006. Nava competed at five editions of the South American Championships in Athletics from 2001 to 2007, having a best pole vault finish of fourth in 2001 and 2006. He was a participant at the Pan American Games in 2003 and 2007, and also the 2003 Summer Universiade.

He began his international career in 1998 and took silver medals behind compatriot Jorge Naranjo at the South American Youth and South American Junior Championships. He defended the junior title in 2001 before falling behind Brazil's Fábio Gomes da Silva in 2002. He also won a silver behind Naranjo during this period at the 2001 Pan American Junior Athletics Championships. He represented Chile at the 1999 World Youth Championships in Athletics and the World Junior Championships in Athletics in 2000 and 2002.

He also won gold medals at the 2007 ALBA Games and the South American University Games in 2004.

International competitions

References

External links

Living people
1983 births
Chilean male pole vaulters
Chilean male triple jumpers
Chilean decathletes
Athletes (track and field) at the 2003 Pan American Games
Athletes (track and field) at the 2007 Pan American Games
Pan American Games competitors for Chile
South American Games silver medalists for Chile
South American Games medalists in athletics
Competitors at the 2002 South American Games
20th-century Chilean people
21st-century Chilean people